Niel Lynne is a 1985 Australian film about a young man during the 1960s.

Plot
Niel Lynne is a romance influenced by his rebellious cousin Eric. Niel falls in love with his cousin Patricia, who has spent time in Paris. Nr

Patricia then goes to Canberra. Neil joins Eric in Melbourne. Eric is dating the beautiful Fennimore. Niel works as an editor for the student newspaper. Then Niel volunteers to fight in Vietnam and Patricia joins the Viet Cong. They are reunited and get married.

Cast
Paul Williams as Niel
Judy Morris as Patricia

Production
David Baker tried to get up the film for eight years. The script was inspired by 'Siren Voices', Henry Handel Richardson's 1896 translation of a story by Danish writer, J.P. Jacobs, Niels Lyhne. It was originally set in the 1930s but Baker updated it to the Vietnam War.

The film was funded by a pre-sale to Channel Seven and to the Australian Film Commission's Special Production Fund. It was shot over seven weeks in and around Melbourne.

The film finished under budget and the management company making the film were allowed to be reimbursed up to 10% of the $1.9 million budget if the production ran under - Niel Lynne ran under budget to almost exactly that amount and the money was paid out as bonuses.

David Baker cut eleven minutes from the film including a subplot involving Nicki Paull as Lynne's teenage bride who is killed in a car accident.

Release
Despite the strength of its cast, the film was never released to cinemas and went straight to television.
Later released in America on video under the title "Best Enemies"

References

External links
Niel Lynne at IMDb
Niel Lynne at BFI
Niel Lynne at National Film and Sound Archive

Australian drama films
Films scored by Chris Neal (songwriter)
1980s English-language films
Films directed by David Baker
1980s Australian films